The 9th Wyoming Territorial Legislature was a former meeting of the Wyoming Legislature that lasted from January 12, to March 12, 1886.

History

Formation

The 1885 elections held for the 9th Wyoming Territorial Legislature were contested through the legality of the elections, but the United States Congress and President Grover Cleveland passed legislation on January 19, 1886, legalizing the elections that were held in Wyoming. John S. Kerr was selected to serve as Speaker of the House of Representatives and J. W. Blake was selected to serve as President of the Council.

Legislation

The territorial legislature passed legislation allocating $150,000 for the creation of a state capitol building. The legislature also passed a bill organizing Niobrara and Fetterman counties, however, Fetterman County would never be formed and Niobrara County wouldn't be formed until 1911.

Membership

Council

Members of the Wyoming Council

House of Representatives

Members of the Wyoming House of Representatives

References

Wyoming legislative sessions